Fremont County School District #24 is a public school district based in Shoshoni, Wyoming, United States.

Geography
Fremont County School District #24 serves the northeastern portion of Fremont County, including the following communities:

Incorporated places
Town of Shoshoni
Unincorporated places
Lysite

Schools
Shoshoni High School (Grades 9–12)
Shoshoni Junior High School (Grades 7–8)
Shoshoni Elementary School (Grades PK-6)

Student demographics
The following figures are as of October 1, 2009.

Total District Enrollment: 294
Student enrollment by gender
Male: 143 (48.64%)
Female: 151 (51.36%)
Student enrollment by ethnicity
American Indian or Alaska Native: 4 (1.36%)
Hispanic or Latino: 20 (6.80%)
White: 270 (91.84%)

See also
List of school districts in Wyoming

References

External links
Fremont County School District #24 – official site.

Education in Fremont County, Wyoming
School districts in Wyoming